Pseudozumia is a small genus of potter wasps which is found in the Afrotropical and Indomalayan regions.

References

Biological pest control wasps
Potter wasps
Hymenoptera genera